Charles Waldo MacLean (June 28, 1903 - March 22, 1985) was a suffragan bishop of the Episcopal Diocese of Long Island in New York.

Biography
MacLean was born on June 28, 1903 in Lincoln, New Hampshire, the son of Howard Douglas MacLean and Ethel Holmes. He graduated from St Stephen's College in Annandale-on-Hudson, New York in 1925 and then from the General Theological Seminary in New York City in 1928. He was ordained deacon in May 1928 and priest in February 1929. During his priestly ministry he served as curate of the Church of the Epiphany in New York City between 1928 and 1930, after which he became vicar of St John's Chapel in Richmond Hill, Queens. In 1933 he became rector of Grace Church in Riverhead, New York. In 1950 he was appointed archdeacon in charge of diocesan administration. He was also created as an honorary canon at the Cathedral of Incarnation in Garden City, New York in 1947.

In 1961 he was elected Suffragan Bishop of Long Island and was consecrated on February 14, 1962 and served until retirement in 1975.  He died on March 22, 1985 in NYU Winthrop Hospital after a brief illness. [[Bishop Charles Waldo MacLean Episcopal Nursing Home in Queens, New York, is named in his memory.

References 

New York Times obituary

1903 births
1985 deaths
20th-century American Episcopalians
Episcopal bishops of Long Island
20th-century American clergy